Tripteridia scotochlaena is a moth in the family Geometridae first described by Louis Beethoven Prout in 1931. It is found in New Guinea.

References

Moths described in 1931
Tripteridia